Pic del Port Vell is a mountain in the Pyrenees on the border of Spain and northwest Andorra. The nearest town is Arinsal, La Massana.

Mountains of Andorra
Mountains of Catalonia
Mountains of the Pyrenees
Andorra–Spain border
International mountains of Europe
Two-thousanders of Andorra
Two-thousanders of Spain